Events in the year 2008 in Finland.

Incumbents
President – Tarja Halonen
Prime Minister – Matti Vanhanen
Speaker – Sauli Niinistö

Events
October – the 2008 Finnish municipal elections

Deaths

28 January – Tapio Hämäläinen, actor and theater counsellor (b. 1922)
28 January – Faina Jyrkilä, sociologist (b. 1917)
9 February – Martti Linna, farmer and politician (b. 1911).
27 February – Mandi Lampi, actress and singer (b. 1988).
17 March – Ola Rosendahl, agronomist, farmer and politician (b. 1939)
18 March – Jyrki Hämäläinen, magazine editor and biographer (b. 1942)
18 March – Mia Permanto, pop singer and radio host (b. 1988)
7 April – Esko Tommola, newsreader (b. 1930)
10 June – Eero Mäkelä, chef (b. 1942)
25 August – Pehr Henrik Nordgren, composer (b. 1944)
3 September – Aarno Karhilo, diplomat (b. 1927)
16 October – Ere Kokkonen, film director (b. 1938)
27 November – Pekka Pohjola, multi-instrumentalist, composer and producer (b. 1952)

References

 
2000s in Finland
Finland
Finland
Years of the 21st century in Finland